Boris Alexandrovich Rybakov (Russian: Бори́с Алекса́ндрович Рыбако́в, 3 June 1908, Moscow – 27 December 2001) was a Soviet and Russian historian who personified the anti-Normanist vision of Russian history. He is the father of Indologist Rostislav Rybakov.

Life and works 

Rybakov held a chair in Russian history at the Moscow University since 1939, was a deputy dean of the university in 1952–54, and administered the Russian History Institute more than 40 years. In 1954, Rybakov and Andrey Kursanov represented the Soviet Academy of Sciences at the Columbia University Bicentennial in New York City.

His first groundbreaking monograph was the Handicrafts of Ancient Rus (1948), which sought to demonstrate the economic superiority of Kievan Rus to contemporary Western Europe.

Rybakov led important excavations in Moscow, Novgorod, Zvenigorod, Chernigov, Pereyaslav, Tmutarakan and Putivl and published his findings in numerous monographs, including Antiquities of Chernigov (1949), The Chronicles and Bylinas of Ancient Rus (1963), The First Centuries of Russian history (1964), The Tale of Igor's Campaign and Its Contemporaries (1971), Muscovite Maps of the 15th and early 16th Centuries (1974), and Herodotus' Scythia (1979). In the latter book he viewed the Scythians described by Herodotus as ancestors of modern Slavic nations.

In his older years, Rybakov attempted to reconstruct the pantheon and myths of Slavic religion. He outlined his ideas in Ancient Slavic Paganism (1981) and Ancient Paganism of Rus (1987). Some of these reconstructions have been heavily criticized as far-fetched.

Honours and awards
 Hero of Socialist Labour (1978)
 Order of Merit for the Fatherland, 3rd class (31 May 1998) - for services to the state, his great personal contribution to the development of national science and training of scientific personnel
 Three Orders of Lenin
 Order of the October Revolution
 Order of the Red Banner of Labour
 Order of the Badge of Honour (1953)
 Lenin Prize (1976)
 Stalin Prize, twice (1949, 1952)
 Medal "In Commemoration of the 1500th Anniversary of Kiev" (1982)
 Grekov award 
 Member of the Russian Academy of Sciences
 Honorary member of the Czechoslovak, Polish and Bulgarian Academy of Sciences
 Emeritus Professor of Moscow University
 Doctor of Historical Sciences, Moscow State University
 Honorary doctor of the Jagiellonian University in Cracow

References

Bibliography
 Саєнко В. М. Наукові долі О.І. Тереножкіна та Б.О. Рибакова або історія одного листа, написаного до самого себе. // Scriptorium nostrum. –– 2017. – No. 1 (7). – С. 50–86.

1908 births
2001 deaths
Writers from Moscow
20th-century Russian historians
Soviet historians
Soviet archaeologists
Researchers of Slavic religion
Full Members of the USSR Academy of Sciences
Former Old Believers
Heroes of Socialist Labour
Recipients of the Order "For Merit to the Fatherland", 3rd class
Recipients of the Order of Lenin
Lenin Prize winners
Stalin Prize winners
Burials in Troyekurovskoye Cemetery
Archaeologists from Moscow
Rossiyskaya arkheologiya editors